Kearny County (county code KE) is a county located in the U.S. state of Kansas. As of the 2020 census, the county population was 3,983. Its county seat and most populous city is Lakin. The county is named in honor of General Philip Kearny.

History
The original Kearney County was established on March 6, 1873, and was dissolved in 1883, with the land area being split between Hamilton and Finney counties.  It was reestablished with its original borders in 1887, and organized on March 27, 1888.  The county is named in honor of Philip Kearny, a U.S. Army officer in the Mexican–American War and a Union army general in the American Civil War.  In 1889, the name was corrected to Kearny County.

Geography

Major highways
 U.S. Highway 50
 U.S. Highway 400
 K-25

Time zones

The west half of Kearny County observed Mountain Standard Time until October 28, 1990, when the Kansas Department of Transportation moved the entire county into the Central Time Zone, which 100 of the state's other 104 counties observe. Only four counties (Hamilton, Greeley, Wallace, and Sherman), all of which border Colorado, observe Mountain Time.

Adjacent counties
 Wichita County (north)
 Scott County (northeast)
 Finney County (east)
 Grant County (south)
 Stanton County (southwest)
 Hamilton County (west/Mountain Time border)

Demographics

Kearny County is included in the Garden City, KS Micropolitan Statistical Area.

As of the 2000 census, there were 4,531 people, 1,542 households, and 1,199 families residing in the county.  The population density was 5 people per square mile (2/km2).  There were 1,657 housing units at an average density of 2 per square mile (1/km2).  The racial makeup of the county was 80.34% White, 0.55% Black or African American, 0.86% Native American, 0.31% Asian, 0.09% Pacific Islander, 15.71% from other races, and 2.14% from two or more races.  Hispanic or Latino of any race were 26.55% of the population.

There were 1,542 households, out of which 43.50% had children under the age of 18 living with them, 65.10% were married couples living together, 8.30% had a female householder with no husband present, and 22.20% were non-families. 20.20% of all households were made up of individuals, and 8.50% had someone living alone who was 65 years of age or older.  The average household size was 2.91 and the average family size was 3.35.

In the county, the population was spread out, with 34.30% under the age of 18, 8.30% from 18 to 24, 27.10% from 25 to 44, 19.20% from 45 to 64, and 11.10% who were 65 years of age or older.  The median age was 32 years. For every 100 females there were 104.70 males.  For every 100 females age 18 and over, there were 98.50 males.

The median income for a household in the county was $40,149, and the median income for a family was $43,703. Males had a median income of $30,117 versus $20,179 for females. The per capita income for the county was $15,708.  About 8.40% of families and 11.70% of the population were below the poverty line, including 15.90% of those under age 18 and 4.80% of those age 65 or over.

Government

Presidential elections

Laws
Following amendment to the Kansas Constitution in 1986, the county remained a prohibition, or "dry", county until 1988, when voters approved the sale of alcoholic liquor by the individual drink with a 30 percent food sales requirement.

Education

Unified school districts
 Lakin USD 215
 Deerfield USD 216

Communities

Cities
 Deerfield
 Lakin

Townships
Kearny County is divided into seven townships.  None of the cities within the county are considered governmentally independent, and all figures for the townships include those of the cities.  In the following table, the population center is the largest city (or cities) included in that township's population total, if it is of a significant size.

See also

References

Notes

Further reading

External links

County
 
 Kearny County - Directory of Public Officials
Maps
 Kearny County Maps: Current, Historic, KDOT
 Kansas Highway Maps: Current, Historic, KDOT
 Kansas Railroad Maps: Current, 1996, 1915, KDOT and Kansas Historical Society

 
Kansas counties
1873 establishments in Kansas
Populated places established in 1873